HMS Oakham Castle was a Royal Navy corvette of the Castle class. Built as a convoy escort during the Second World War, it later became a weather ship before being scrapped in 1977.

Design and construction
The Castle-class corvettes were an improved and enlarged derivative of the earlier Flower-class corvettes, which was intended to be built by shipyards that could not build the larger and more capable frigates. The greater length of the Castles gave made them better seaboats than the Flowers, which were not originally designed for ocean escort work. Large numbers (96 in total) were ordered in late 1942 and early 1943 from shipyards in the United Kingdom and Canada, but Allied successes in the Battle of the Atlantic meant that the requirement for escorts was reduced, and many ships (including all the Canadian ones) were cancelled.

Displacement was about  standard and  full load.

The ships had a main gun armament of a single QF 4-inch Mk XIX dual-purpose gun, backed up by two twin and two single Oerlikon 20 mm cannon. Anti-submarine armament consisted of a single triple-barrelled Squid anti-submarine mortar with 81 charges backed up by two depth charge throwers and a single depth charge rail, with 15 depth charges carried. Type 272 or Type 277 surface search radar was fitted, as was high-frequency direction finding (HF/DF) gear. The ships' sonar outfit was Type 145 and Type 147B.
 
Oakham Castle was one of 13 Castle-class corvettes ordered on 19 December 1942. The ship was laid down at A & J Inglis's Glasgow shipyard on 30 November 1943, launched on 20 July 1944, and completed on 10 December 1944.

Career
On entering service, Oakham Castle was employed on convoy escort duty in the North Atlantic.

In 1948, Oakham Castle joined the 2nd Training Squadron based at Portland Harbour, continuing to serve in this duty until December 1950, when she was reduced to reserve at Devonport. Oakham Castle was refitted in 1953, and then was laid up in a preserved condition at South Shields. The ship was transferred to the Met Office in 1957, and was converted to a Weather ship by James Lamont & Co. at Greenock. On 16 May 1958 the ship was renamed Weather Reporter by Lord Hurcomb. It was scrapped in 1977.

See also
Oakham Castle

References

Publications
 
 .

External links 
 HMS Oakham Castle (K 530). uboat.net
http://www.weatherships.co.uk/oakham_reporter.htm
 
 

Corvettes of the United Kingdom
Castle-class corvettes
1944 ships